Achchani is a 1978 Indian Tamil-language drama film directed by Karaikudi Narayanan, starring R. Muthuraman, Lakshmi and S. A. Ashokan. It is based on the play of the same name. The film was released on 4 February 1978 and became a success.

Plot

Cast 
R. Muthuraman
Lakshmi
Ashokan
Shobha

Production 
The film is based on the play of the same name.

Soundtrack 
The soundtrack was composed by Ilaiyaraaja. The song "Thaalaattu" is set in the Carnatic raga known as Madhyamavati. The song "Maatha Un Kovilil" was re-used in Naan Kadavul (2009). Gangai Amaran who was assisting Ilayaraja at that time mentioned in an interview that it was inspired by "Awargi", one of the famous ghazals composed by Ghulam Ali.

Release and reception 
Achchani was released on 4 February 1978, and was commercially successful.

References

External links 
 

1978 films
Films scored by Ilaiyaraaja
1970s Tamil-language films
Indian drama films
Indian films based on plays
1978 drama films